The 1983–84 Pittsburgh Penguins season was the club's 17th season of operation in the National Hockey League (NHL). The Penguins placed sixth in their division and did not qualify for the playoffs.

Offseason
Eddie Johnston, who had been the interim general manager, was awarded the GM title in June. He named Lou Angotti to take over the coaching duties.

A controversy surrounding the end of the 1983-84 season was the apparent throwing of games by the Pittsburgh Penguins in order to secure Mario Lemieux as a draft pick. Angotti admitted the team deliberately tanked the season, though Johnston denied the claims.

Regular season

Final standings

Schedule and results

|- style="background:#fcf;"
| 1 || Oct 4 || Pittsburgh Penguins || 3–5 || St. Louis Blues || The Checkerdome || 0–1–0 || 0
|- style="background:#fcf;"
| 2 || Oct 8 || New York Rangers || 6–1 || Pittsburgh Penguins || Civic Arena || 0–2–0 || 0
|- style="background:#fcf;"
| 3 || Oct 9 || Pittsburgh Penguins || 1–7 || Philadelphia Flyers || The Spectrum || 0–3–0 || 0
|- style="background:#fcf;"
| 4 || Oct 12 || Winnipeg Jets || 4–3 OT || Pittsburgh Penguins || Civic Arena || 0–4–0 || 0
|- style="background:#cfc;"
| 5 || Oct 14 || Pittsburgh Penguins || 4–0 || Washington Capitals || Capital Centre || 1–4–0 || 2
|- style="background:#fcf;"
| 6 || Oct 15 || Hartford Whalers || 6–4 || Pittsburgh Penguins || Civic Arena || 1–5–0 || 2
|- style="background:#fcf;"
| 7 || Oct 18 || Buffalo Sabres || 3–1 || Pittsburgh Penguins || Civic Arena || 1–6–0 || 2
|- style="background:#fcf;"
| 8 || Oct 22 || Boston Bruins || 6–1 || Pittsburgh Penguins || Civic Arena || 1–7–0 || 2
|- style="background:#fcf;"
| 9 || Oct 25 || Washington Capitals || 1–0 || Pittsburgh Penguins || Civic Arena || 1–8–0 || 2
|- style="background:#cfc;"
| 10 || Oct 27 || Pittsburgh Penguins || 4–2 || Chicago Black Hawks || Chicago Stadium || 2–8–0 || 4
|- style="background:#fcf;"
| 11 || Oct 29 || Philadelphia Flyers || 3–1 || Pittsburgh Penguins || Civic Arena || 2–9–0 || 4
|- style="background:#cfc;"
| 12 || Oct 30 || Pittsburgh Penguins || 5–3 || New Jersey Devils || Izod Center || 3–9–0 || 6
|-

|- style="background:#cfc;"
| 13 || Nov 2 || Pittsburgh Penguins || 6–3 || Winnipeg Jets || Winnipeg Arena || 4–9–0 || 8
|- style="background:#ffc;"
| 14 || Nov 3 || Pittsburgh Penguins || 3–3 OT || Calgary Flames || Scotiabank Saddledome || 4–9–1 || 9
|- style="background:#fcf;"
| 15 || Nov 5 || Pittsburgh Penguins || 3–7 || Edmonton Oilers || Northlands Coliseum || 4–10–1 || 9
|- style="background:#ffc;"
| 16 || Nov 8 || Calgary Flames || 4–4 OT || Pittsburgh Penguins || Civic Arena || 4–10–2 || 10
|- style="background:#fcf;"
| 17 || Nov 11 || New York Islanders || 6–5 || Pittsburgh Penguins || Civic Arena || 4–11–2 || 10
|- style="background:#cfc;"
| 18 || Nov 12 || Pittsburgh Penguins || 4–2 || New York Islanders || Nassau Veterans Memorial Coliseum || 5–11–2 || 12
|- style="background:#fcf;"
| 19 || Nov 16 || Toronto Maple Leafs || 3–2 || Pittsburgh Penguins || Civic Arena || 5–12–2 || 12
|- style="background:#ffc;"
| 20 || Nov 19 || St. Louis Blues || 4–4 OT || Pittsburgh Penguins || Civic Arena || 5–12–3 || 13
|- style="background:#fcf;"
| 21 || Nov 20 || Pittsburgh Penguins || 4–5 OT || Philadelphia Flyers || The Spectrum || 5–13–3 || 13
|- style="background:#cfc;"
| 22 || Nov 23 || New Jersey Devils || 1–4 || Pittsburgh Penguins || Civic Arena || 6–13–3 || 15
|- style="background:#fcf;"
| 23 || Nov 25 || Pittsburgh Penguins || 2–5 || Detroit Red Wings || Joe Louis Arena || 6–14–3 || 15
|- style="background:#fcf;"
| 24 || Nov 26 || Detroit Red Wings || 7–4 || Pittsburgh Penguins || Civic Arena || 6–15–3 || 15
|- style="background:#fcf;"
| 25 || Nov 29 || Pittsburgh Penguins || 4–6 || Minnesota North Stars || Met Center || 6–16–3 || 15
|-

|- style="background:#fcf;"
| 26 || Dec 1 || Minnesota North Stars || 6–4 || Pittsburgh Penguins || Civic Arena || 6–17–3 || 15
|- style="background:#fcf;"
| 27 || Dec 3 || Philadelphia Flyers || 6–3 || Pittsburgh Penguins || Civic Arena || 6–18–3 || 15
|- style="background:#fcf;"
| 28 || Dec 6 || Boston Bruins || 5–3 || Pittsburgh Penguins || Civic Arena || 6–19–3 || 15
|- style="background:#ffc;"
| 29 || Dec 11 || Montreal Canadiens || 3–3 OT || Pittsburgh Penguins || Civic Arena || 6–19–4 || 16
|- style="background:#cfc;"
| 30 || Dec 13 || Hartford Whalers || 2–3 || Pittsburgh Penguins || Civic Arena || 7–19–4 || 18
|- style="background:#fcf;"
| 31 || Dec 15 || Pittsburgh Penguins || 1–3 || Montreal Canadiens || Montreal Forum || 7–20–4 || 18
|- style="background:#fcf;"
| 32 || Dec 17 || Los Angeles Kings || 6–5 || Pittsburgh Penguins || Civic Arena || 7–21–4 || 18
|- style="background:#ffc;"
| 33 || Dec 18 || Pittsburgh Penguins || 3–3 OT || Toronto Maple Leafs || Maple Leaf Gardens || 7–21–5 || 19
|- style="background:#fcf;"
| 34 || Dec 20 || Pittsburgh Penguins || 3–11 || New York Islanders || Nassau Veterans Memorial Coliseum || 7–22–5 || 19
|- style="background:#fcf;"
| 35 || Dec 21 || Pittsburgh Penguins || 1–6 || New York Rangers || Madison Square Garden (IV) || 7–23–5 || 19
|- style="background:#cfc;"
| 36 || Dec 23 || Pittsburgh Penguins || 6–5 OT || New Jersey Devils || Izod Center || 8–23–5 || 21
|- style="background:#cfc;"
| 37 || Dec 26 || New York Rangers || 4–7 || Pittsburgh Penguins || Civic Arena || 9–23–5 || 23
|- style="background:#fcf;"
| 38 || Dec 31 || Pittsburgh Penguins || 0–2 || St. Louis Blues || The Checkerdome || 9–24–5 || 23
|-

|- style="background:#fcf;"
| 39 || Jan 3 || Philadelphia Flyers || 7–5 || Pittsburgh Penguins || Civic Arena || 9–25–5 || 23
|- style="background:#fcf;"
| 40 || Jan 6 || Pittsburgh Penguins || 1–3 || New Jersey Devils || Izod Center || 9–26–5 || 23
|- style="background:#fcf;"
| 41 || Jan 7 || New Jersey Devils || 7–4 || Pittsburgh Penguins || Civic Arena || 9–27–5 || 23
|- style="background:#fcf;"
| 42 || Jan 10 || Pittsburgh Penguins || 1–7 || Quebec Nordiques || Quebec Coliseum || 9–28–5 || 23
|- style="background:#fcf;"
| 43 || Jan 14 || Pittsburgh Penguins || 3–7 || Boston Bruins || Boston Garden || 9–29–5 || 23
|- style="background:#fcf;"
| 44 || Jan 15 || Pittsburgh Penguins || 0–2 || Chicago Black Hawks || Chicago Stadium || 9–30–5 || 23
|- style="background:#fcf;"
| 45 || Jan 18 || Winnipeg Jets || 5–4 OT || Pittsburgh Penguins || Civic Arena || 9–31–5 || 23
|- style="background:#cfc;"
| 46 || Jan 20 || Pittsburgh Penguins || 6–3 || New York Rangers || Madison Square Garden (IV) || 10–31–5 || 25
|- style="background:#fcf;"
| 47 || Jan 21 || Washington Capitals || 3–2 || Pittsburgh Penguins || Civic Arena || 10–32–5 || 25
|- style="background:#fcf;"
| 48 || Jan 25 || New York Rangers || 6–3 || Pittsburgh Penguins || Civic Arena || 10–33–5 || 25
|- style="background:#fcf;"
| 49 || Jan 28 || Pittsburgh Penguins || 2–5 || Montreal Canadiens || Montreal Forum || 10–34–5 || 25
|- style="background:#fcf;"
| 50 || Jan 29 || Pittsburgh Penguins || 3–7 || Buffalo Sabres || Buffalo Memorial Auditorium || 10–35–5 || 25
|-

|- style="background:#cfc;"
| 51 || Feb 1 || Minnesota North Stars || 0–4 || Pittsburgh Penguins || Civic Arena || 11–35–5 || 27
|- style="background:#fcf;"
| 52 || Feb 4 || Pittsburgh Penguins || 5–6 || New York Islanders || Nassau Veterans Memorial Coliseum || 11–36–5 || 27
|- style="background:#fcf;"
| 53 || Feb 5 || New York Islanders || 5–4 || Pittsburgh Penguins || Civic Arena || 11–37–5 || 27
|- style="background:#fcf;"
| 54 || Feb 8 || Buffalo Sabres || 6–5 OT || Pittsburgh Penguins || Civic Arena || 11–38–5 || 27
|- style="background:#fcf;"
| 55 || Feb 9 || Pittsburgh Penguins || 3–9 || Detroit Red Wings || Joe Louis Arena || 11–39–5 || 27
|- style="background:#cfc;"
| 56 || Feb 11 || New Jersey Devils || 2–3 || Pittsburgh Penguins || Civic Arena || 12–39–5 || 29
|- style="background:#fcf;"
| 57 || Feb 13 || Pittsburgh Penguins || 1–6 || Quebec Nordiques || Quebec Coliseum || 12–40–5 || 29
|- style="background:#fcf;"
| 58 || Feb 16 || Pittsburgh Penguins || 3–10 || Calgary Flames || Scotiabank Saddledome || 12–41–5 || 29
|- style="background:#cfc;"
| 59 || Feb 17 || Pittsburgh Penguins || 4–1 || Vancouver Canucks || Pacific Coliseum || 13–41–5 || 31
|- style="background:#fcf;"
| 60 || Feb 19 || Pittsburgh Penguins || 3–7 || Edmonton Oilers || Northlands Coliseum || 13–42–5 || 31
|- style="background:#fcf;"
| 61 || Feb 22 || Edmonton Oilers || 9–2 || Pittsburgh Penguins || Civic Arena || 13–43–5 || 31
|- style="background:#ffc;"
| 62 || Feb 25 || Chicago Black Hawks || 3–3 OT || Pittsburgh Penguins || Civic Arena || 13–43–6 || 32
|- style="background:#fcf;"
| 63 || Feb 26 || Pittsburgh Penguins || 3–4 OT || New York Rangers || Madison Square Garden (IV) || 13–44–6 || 32
|- style="background:#fcf;"
| 64 || Feb 29 || Vancouver Canucks || 9–5 || Pittsburgh Penguins || Civic Arena || 13–45–6 || 32
|-

|- style="background:#fcf;"
| 65 || Mar 1 || Pittsburgh Penguins || 1–9 || Washington Capitals || Capital Centre || 13–46–6 || 32
|- style="background:#cfc;"
| 66 || Mar 3 || Los Angeles Kings || 3–4 || Pittsburgh Penguins || Civic Arena || 14–46–6 || 34
|- style="background:#fcf;"
| 67 || Mar 5 || Washington Capitals || 5–2 || Pittsburgh Penguins || Civic Arena || 14–47–6 || 34
|- style="background:#fcf;"
| 68 || Mar 6 || Pittsburgh Penguins || 5–6 || New Jersey Devils || Izod Center || 14–48–6 || 34
|- style="background:#fcf;"
| 69 || Mar 8 || Quebec Nordiques || 8–6 || Pittsburgh Penguins || Civic Arena || 14–49–6 || 34
|- style="background:#fcf;"
| 70 || Mar 11 || New York Islanders || 6–4 || Pittsburgh Penguins || Civic Arena || 14–50–6 || 34
|- style="background:#fcf;"
| 71 || Mar 13 || Pittsburgh Penguins || 3–4 || Vancouver Canucks || Pacific Coliseum || 14–51–6 || 34
|- style="background:#fcf;"
| 72 || Mar 14 || Pittsburgh Penguins || 6–7 || Los Angeles Kings || The Forum || 14–52–6 || 34
|- style="background:#cfc;"
| 73 || Mar 17 || Pittsburgh Penguins || 4–2 || Hartford Whalers || XL Center || 15–52–6 || 36
|- style="background:#cfc;"
| 74 || Mar 21 || Toronto Maple Leafs || 1–3 || Pittsburgh Penguins || Civic Arena || 16–52–6 || 38
|- style="background:#fcf;"
| 75 || Mar 22 || Pittsburgh Penguins || 4–13 || Philadelphia Flyers || The Spectrum || 16–53–6 || 38
|- style="background:#fcf;"
| 76 || Mar 24 || Pittsburgh Penguins || 0–6 || Washington Capitals || Capital Centre || 16–54–6 || 38
|- style="background:#fcf;"
| 77 || Mar 25 || Washington Capitals || 4–3 || Pittsburgh Penguins || Civic Arena || 16–55–6 || 38
|- style="background:#fcf;"
| 78 || Mar 28 || Philadelphia Flyers || 5–3 || Pittsburgh Penguins || Civic Arena || 16–56–6 || 38
|- style="background:#fcf;"
| 79 || Mar 29 || Pittsburgh Penguins || 4–6 || New York Rangers || Madison Square Garden (IV) || 16–57–6 || 38
|-

|- style="background:#fcf;"
| 80 || Apr 1 || New York Islanders || 2–1 || Pittsburgh Penguins || Civic Arena || 16–58–6 || 38
|-

|- style="text-align:center;"
| Legend:       = Win       = Loss       = Tie

Playoffs
The Penguins did not qualify for the playoffs for the second straight year, finishing in last place again.

Player statistics
Skaters

Goaltenders

†Denotes player spent time with another team before joining the Penguins.  Stats reflect time with the Penguins only.
‡Denotes player was traded mid-season.  Stats reflect time with the Penguins only.

Awards and records
 Rick Kehoe established a new franchise record for points with 634. He topped the previous record of 603 held by Jean Pronovost.
 Pat Boutette established a new franchise record for lowest plus-minus with –56. He topped the previous record of –51 held by Paul Baxter.
 fewest wins in team history (16)
 fewest points in team history (38)

Transactions

The Penguins were involved in the following transactions during the 1983–84 season:

Trades

Additions and subtractions

Draft picks 

The 1983 NHL Entry Draft was held on June 8, 1983 in Montreal, Quebec.

Farm teams

See also
 1983–84 NHL season

References

External links

Pittsburgh Penguins seasons
Pittsburgh
Pittsburgh
Pitts
Pitts